Sri Siva Durga Temple is a temple for the god Shiva and Durga who are the presiding deities located in the Potong Pasir subzone of the Toa Payoh planning area, Singapore.

History 
In 2014, the temple was demolished due to issues such as water leakage, lack of space and ventilation problems. The sculpture of Hindu goddess Sri Durga remained in its original spot, encased in bricks to protect it while the temple is rebuilt around it. The rebuilding costs $2.7 million and finished in 2016.

On 4 Dec 2016, a consecration ceremony was held by the temple with the help of its coffeeshop neighbour, PP 881 Eating House and the Mahakaruna Buddhist Society.

See also

 List of Hindu temples in Singapore

References

External links
Temple Official website

Hindu temples in Singapore
Indian diaspora in Singapore
Tamil Singaporean
Toa Payoh
Tourist attractions in Singapore